The 1985 Bandy World Championship was the 14th Bandy World Championship and was contested between as many as five men's bandy playing nations, more than ever before, as the United States entered the championship for the first time. The championship was played in Norway from 3 February-10 February 1985. The Soviet Union became champions.

Participants

Premier tour
 3 February
 USA – Norway 1–5
 Soviet Union – Finland 5–1
 4 February
 Soviet Union – Sweden 1–1
 Norway – Finland 4–4
 5 February
 USA – Sweden 1–12
 6 February
 Soviet Union – Norway 3–1
 7 February
 Finland – USA 6–1
 Norway – Sweden 0–12
 8 February
 Finland – Sweden 3–3
 Soviet Union – USA 8–0

Match for 3rd place
 10 February
 Finland – Norway 6–2

Final
 10 February
 Sweden – Soviet Union 3–3, 4–5 aet

References

1985
World Championship
Bandy World Championship
International bandy competitions hosted by Norway
Bandy World Championship